Separated can refer to:

Marital separation of spouses
Legal separation of spouses
"Separated" (song), song by Avant
Separated sets, a concept in mathematical topology
Separated space, a synonym for Hausdorff space, a concept in mathematical topology
Separated morphism, a concept in algebraic geometry analogous to that of separated space in topology
Separation of conjoined twins, a procedure that allows them to live independently.
Separation (United States military), status of U.S. military personnel after release from active duty, but still having reserve obligations